Bredon railway station was on the Birmingham–Gloucester railway line to the north of Ashchurch for Tewkesbury railway station. The station closed in 1965.

History

The station closed to goods on 1 July 1963, and to passengers on 4 January 1965.

The line through the site of the station remains in use as part of the Bristol to Birmingham main line.

Notes

References

Further reading

Disused railway stations in Worcestershire
Former Midland Railway stations
Railway stations in Great Britain opened in 1840
Railway stations in Great Britain closed in 1965
Beeching closures in England